Mount Ossa is a rural town and a coastal locality in the Mackay Region, Queensland, Australia.

Geography 
The locality is bounded in the north by the Coral Sea and in north-west by Murray Creek and in the north-east by Conow Creek, both of which flow into the Coral Sea. The central and north-eastern parts of the locality are mostly low-lying land (10–20 metres above sea level) and well-watered by a number of minor creeks. This land is freehold and predominantly used for growing sugarcane on the flatter level with some cattle grazing. The south-western part of the locality is mountainous including Mount Ossa (270 metres) from which the town takes its name. The south-western part is mostly bushland and includes the Mount Ossa National Park.

The town is situated in the centre of the locality. The Bruce Highway traverses the locality from south-east to west passing through the town. At the town, the highway has a junction with the Mount Ossa Seaforth Road which exits the locality in the north-east. About one kilometre north-west of the town, the highway has another junction with the Mirani Mount Ossa Road which exits the locality in the south-west. The North Coast railway line also traverses the locality from south-east to west roughly parallel and north-east relative to the highway. The town is served by the Mount Ossa railway station. There are two other abandoned railway stations in the locality:

 Buthurra, near the south-eastern boundary of the locality
 Clanside, near the western boundary of the locality

History 
The town was named after the Mount Ossa railway station, which in turn was named after the mountain. The mountain's name was assigned by surveyor William Charles Borlase Wilson, using a name from Greek mythology (Mounts Ossa and Pelion).

The Silent Grove Provisional School opened on 29 August 1928. On 3 February 1936 the Silent Grove Upper State School opened. In 1938, the Silent Grove Provisional School closed, being replaced by the Mount Ossa State School. The Silent Grove Upper State School closed about 1964 and the Mount Ossa State School closed in 1970. Silent Grove Upper State School was at 2948 Mirani-Mount Ossa Road (now in Mount Charlton). Mount Ossa State School was on Mount Ossa School Road.

Education 
There are no schools in Mount Ossa. The nearest primary schools are Calen District College in neighbouring Calen to the north-west, Seaforth State School in neighbouring Seaforth to the north-east, and Hampden State School in Hampden to the south-east. The nearest secondary schools are Calen District College in neighbouring Calen to the north-west, Mackay North State High School in North Mackay in Mackay to the south-west, and Mirani State High School in Mirani to the south.

References

Further reading 

  —  includes Cameron's Pocket State School, Silent Grove State School, Mount Ossa State School, and Mount Pelion State School.

External links 

 

Towns in Queensland
Mackay Region
Coastline of Queensland
Localities in Queensland